Montpelier High School is a public high school in Montpelier, Ohio. It is the only high school in the Montpelier Exempted Village School district. Their nickname is the Locomotives. They are primarily members of the Buckeye Border Conference.

Athletics
Beginning with the 2016–17 school year, Montpelier became a member of the Buckeye Border Conference after a long tenure (1926–2016) as a member of the Northwest Ohio Athletic League.  The Locos will play football in the Toledo Area Athletic Conference (TAAC), remain in the NWOAL for wrestling only, and participate in every other sport as a BBC member.

Buckeye Border Conference championships (2016–)
Varsity Boys Cross Country – 2016
Varsity Boys Track & Field – 2017, 2018, 2019

Toledo Area Athletic Conference football championships (2016–)
2016*

Northwest Ohio Athletic League (NWOAL) championships (1926–2016)
Football: 1928, 1945, 1946*, 1950, 1983*
Volleyball: 1975, 1976, 1979, 1980, 2000*
Boys Basketball: 1930–31*, 1954–55, 1955–56
Girls Basketball: 1998–99*
Wrestling: 1959–60
Baseball: 1956
Boys Track & Field: 1927, 1940*, 1943, 1944, 1951, 1961, 1963, 1970, 1980
Girls Track & Field: 1973, 1974, 1975, 1976

Northern Border League championships (1969–1978)
Football: 1969*, 1973
Golf: 1970, 1971, 1972, 1973, 1975
Volleyball: 1974*, 1975
Girls Basketball: 1974–75
Baseball: 1970*
Boys Track & Field: 1970, 1971, 1972*
Girls Track & Field: 1975, 1976

Note: shared league titles are denoted with an asterisk (*)

External links
District Website

High schools in Williams County, Ohio
Public high schools in Ohio